Arhangel (archangel) is a Macedonian alternative rock band formed in 1989. The frontman is Risto Vrtev who has also been part of such rock bands as Mizar and Inola X. The original line-up is: Risto Vrtev, Dragan Ginovski, Panta Džambazoski (drums) and Dejan Argirovski. Arhangel has released five albums (four studio and one live) which have been met with both critical and commercial success. The band's sound is both muscular and melodic at the same time, echoing post-punk icons such as the English The Smiths and the Serbian Ekaterina Velika, while the band's lyrical inspirations focus is on the country's political and cultural changes during the 1990s. The band is also associated with the art movement Makedonska Streljba (Macedonian Barrage) during the 1980s and the 1990s.

The name "Arhangel" comes from a song written during frontman Vrtev's time in Mizar, which would later appear on the group's debut self-titled album. Other ex-Mizar songs used in Arhangel include "Isus" and "Dva vo eden".

Discography
 Arhangel (1991)
 Arhangel 2 (1993)
 Heart Core (1998)
 Heavenly Machine (2003)
 Live in Skopje (2004)
Members of the band from 1991-2005 who recorded the albums are:
Vrtev Risto-vocal, Ginovski Dragan Gino-guitars, Jankov Petar- bass, Dimitar Dimovski Mite- drums, Parushev Mihail-drums (Arhangel 2), Maksimovski Gjoko Djole bass (Live in Skopje).

See also
Music of Republic of Macedonia
Anastasia
Mizar
Padot na Vizantija
Yugoslav rock

Macedonian rock music groups
Yugoslav rock music groups